Iain Valjean Jensen  (born 23 May 1988 in Belmont, New South Wales) is an Australian sailor.

He started sailing in his hometown of Wangi Wangi when he was five years old, with his Olympic and Artemis Racing teammate Nathan Outteridge.

With Outteridge, he won the 2009 and 2011 49er World Championships and gold at the 2012 Summer Olympics in the 49ers class. The team also won silver at the 2016 Summer Olympics.

He is a member of the NSW Institute of Sport in Sydney and a wing trimmer for Artemis Racing. He lives in Lake Macquarie.

Career highlights 
 2011 Sailing World Cup Medemblik, Netherlands – 2nd in 49er
 2011 Sailing World Cup Weymouth Great Britain – 1st in 49er
 2011 European Championships Helsinki Finland – 1st in 49er
 2011 Olympic Test Event Weymouth Great Britain – 1st in 49er
 2011 World Championships Perth Australia – 1st in 49er
 2012 Sail for Gold Regatta Weymouth Great Britain – 1st in 49er
 2012 Olympic Games London Great Britain – 1st in 49er
 2017 Moth Sailing World Championships Malcesine Italy – 3rd in Moth class

References

External links
 
 
 
 
 Australians Outteridge & Jensen secure 49er sailing gold
 

1988 births
Living people
Australian male sailors (sport)
Sailors at the 2012 Summer Olympics – 49er
Sailors at the 2016 Summer Olympics – 49er
Olympic sailors of Australia
Olympic gold medalists for Australia
Olympic silver medalists for Australia
Olympic medalists in sailing
Medalists at the 2012 Summer Olympics
Medalists at the 2016 Summer Olympics
49er class world champions
29er class sailors
Artemis Racing sailors
2017 America's Cup sailors
2013 America's Cup sailors
World champions in sailing for Australia
Recipients of the Medal of the Order of Australia